Cannibalism is the act of one individual of a species consuming all or part of another individual of the same species as food.

Cannibalism may also refer to:

Types of cannibalism
 Cannibalism in poultry
 Filial cannibalism
 Human cannibalism
 Endocannibalism
 Exocannibalism
 Sexual cannibalism

Music
 Cannibalism (album), 1978 compilation album by Can
 "Capitalism is Cannibalism", 1982 song and EP by the British anarcho-punk band Anthrax
 Intrauterine Cannibalism, 1999 studio album by American death metal band Malignancy
 Live Cannibalism, 2000 live album by American death metal band Cannibal Corpse

See also 
Cannibal (disambiguation)
Cannibalization (disambiguation)